The United States Improper Payments Elimination and Recovery Act of 2010  was signed by President Barack Obama into law on July 22, 2010. The law requires federal agencies to periodically review and report on major programs that are susceptible to improper payments.

An improper payment is a government payment which "should not have been made or that was made in an incorrect amount under statutory, contractual, administrative, or other legally applicable requirements".

Earlier legislation regarding improper payments included the Improper Payments Information Act of 2002.

References

External links
Improper Payments and Recovery Audits: Legislation, Implementation, and Analysis Congressional Research Service
About Improper Payments
Acts of the 111th United States Congress